The Pocketwatch is an upcoming musical fantasy film directed by Jennifer Phang from an screenplay by Dan Frey and Russell Sommer. Produced by Disney Channel, the film will be a spin-off of the Descendants franchise.

The Pocketwatch is set to be released on Disney+.

Synopsis
Red, daughter of the Queen of Hearts, and Chloe, daughter of Cinderella and Prince Charming, team-up to travel in time with the White Rabbit's pocketwatch and prevent a catastrophic coup on Auradon.

Cast 
 China Anne McClain as Uma
 Kylie Cantrall as Red
 Malia Baker as Chloe Charming
 Dara Reneé as Ulyana
 Brandy Norwood as Cinderella
 Morgan Dudley as Ella, the young Cinderella
 Rita Ora as the Queen of Hearts
 Ruby Rose Turner as Bridget, the young Queen of Hearts
 Joshua Colley as teen Hook
 Melanie Paxson as Fairy Godmother
Grace Narducci as Fay, teenage Fairy Godmother
 Jeremy Swift as Principal Merlin of Merlin Academy
 Leonardo Nam as Maddox, the son of the Mad Hatter and chief inventor for the Queen of Hearts
Sam Morelos as Zellie, the daughter of Rapunzel
Mars as young Maleficent
Peder Lindell as Morgie, son of Morgana le Fay
Anthony Pyatt as teen Hades
Kabir Berry as teen Aladdin
Tristan Padil as teen Prince Charming
Aiza Azaar as teen Jasmine

Production

Development
In August 18, 2021, following the release of the animated special Descendants: The Royal Wedding, Lauren Kisilevsky, Disney Branded Television's Senior Vice President of Original Movies, responded to questions regarding the special's cliffhanger by saying that "[t]he tease is a tease", and was added due to the Descendants films ending with hints at additional stories, and also said that "Disney Channel will see where [they] get with the franchise".

In September 21, 2021, a fourth Descendants film was confirmed to be in development as part of an overall deal between Disney and former Disney Branded Television president Gary Marsh's production company. By May 2022, the film was greenlight by Disney+ as a spin-off under the working title of The Pocketwatch. Jennifer Phang was hired as director and co-executive producer, with Dan Frey and Russell Sommer writing the screenplay and Marsh executive-producing.

Filming
Filming for The Pocketwatch will begin in Fall 2022. Mark Hofeling will return from the original trilogy as production designer. Phang said she wants the choreography during action sequences to still be able to tell an emotional story. For Wonderland's design, Phang used Alice in Wonderland (1951) as a reference while also drawing inspiration from her previous filmmaking experience. Filming took place in Atlanta beginning at the end of January 2023 with plans to run through mid-March.

Casting 
The featured cast announced at the 2022 D23 Expo included China Anne McClain, who is returning to portray Uma, with Kylie Cantrall (as Red) and Dara Reneé (as Ulyana) joining the cast of the film.
In November 2022, casting announcement revealed that Brandy Norwood was returning as Cinderella after playing the role in the 1997 film Cinderella and Melanie Paxson returned as the franchise Fairy Godmother. New cast members to the franchise were Rita Ora as the Queen of Hearts as well as Malia Baker, Ruby Rose Turner, Morgan Dudley, and Joshua Colley. After filming had begun, Jeremy Swift and Leonardo Nam were announced as cast additions in February 2023.

Visual effects 
According to Phang, visual effects will be used to "enhance" the locations featured in the film.

Music 
The Pocketwatch is set to feature both 7 original songs and songs from animated Disney films.

Release 
The Pocketwatch is set to be released on Disney+, marking the first time a Descendants film is not released on Disney Channel.

References

Disney+ original films
Descendants (franchise)